Elapegademase, sold under the brand name Revcovi, is a medication for the treatment of the rare disease adenosine deaminase deficiency-SCID in children and adults.

It is a recombinant enzyme that is administered weekly by intramuscular injection.

Elapegademase may interact with PEGylated drugs.

Elapegademase-lvlr was approved by the U.S. Food and Drug Administration (FDA) in 2018. Leadiant Biosciences was awarded a priority review voucher for its development under the pediatric rare diseases program.

References

External links
 

Enzymes used as drugs
Orphan drugs